Abdulkadir Mohamed Saleh Kebire was an Eritrean political figure born in 1902 at Desiet Island around Massawa. He attended Quranic school followed by the Ferdinando Martini School for his elementary education. At the age of 18, Abdulkadir left for Egypt for pursuit of education and it is where he witnessed the revolution of Saad Zeqlul against the British, an incident that left its mark on him and shaped his rebellious character. A self-educated person, Abdulkadir become more interested in politics and was determined to make a change in his country to improve the livelihood of his people.

Coming back to Eritrea, Abdulkadir worked as a writer in Asmara and Massawa and as translator for the Italian delegation to Hodeida in Yemen. It was a great opportunity for him to acquaint himself with notable politicians and intellectuals of the era. He became a respected socialite around the diplomatic circles in Yemen and gained many friends. His importance was noticeable to the extent that he participated in the team that was set to broker a peace deal between Saudi-Arabia and Yemen over a border disagreement between the two countries. The team included important personalities of the era: Shiekh Amin Al-Hussaini of Palestine (the leader/Martyr of the famous Palestinian uprising); The notable writer Hashim AlAtassi from Syria; and Prince Shekib Arselan of Lebanon. During his trips to Saudi Arabia to negotiate peace, he met and befriended the Saudi Prince, later King, Faisal Bin AbdulAziz, who used to call him ‘Al Messewe’e’.

Political life
On 5 May 1941, after the defeat of the Italians in the Second World War and the occupation of Eritrea by the British, Abdulkadir co-founded and became one of the executive leaders of Mahber Fikri Hager (Association of Love of Country), which was seeking social, economic, and legal rights for Eritreans. The Mahber Fiqri Hager (Love of the Nation Club) leadership was composed of twelve members of whom six were Muslims.

After the war, the Mahber Fiqri Hager called for a peaceful demonstration. Around 3000-4000 people had gathered to take part. They marched to the governor's palace in Asmara where the military administrator of Eritrea, Brigadier General Kennedy Cooke, lived. The demonstrators demanded to communicate through their leaders from the Mahber Fiqri Hager. Because of his educational background and nationalistic feelings, Abdulkadir was selected by MFH to represent the people of Asmara before Brigadier General Cooke.

Approaching the British military authorities, Abdulkadir forwarded a ‘welcome’ speech and proceeded systematically to remind the British of their wartime promises of freedom and self-determination. He also explained that the people of Eritrea were awaiting their response with optimism. However, Cooke's reply was discouraging and degrading,

Eritrean independence
Haile Selassie plan to unify Eritrea with Ethiopia was intensified, aware of this development, concerned nationalist Eritreans, including Abdulkadir and other prominent figures, organized the Wa’ela Biet Ghergis (Treaty of Biet Ghergis) in November 1946. The treaty was aimed at avoiding the permanent division of the MFH and to propose a conditional union with Ethiopia. It was conducted twice. Though the first was in some way successful, the latter proved failure. Its failure initiated a fertile ground for the successive formation of political parties.

One month later, in December 1946, the Muslim League party or commonly known as Al Rabita Al Islamia was founded in Keren. Sheikh Ibrahim Sultan, Haji Suleiman Ahmed, Sheikh Abdulkadir Kebire and others were among the founders and decision makers of the party. In addition to that, Abdulkadir was the head of Hamasien and Asmara branch of Al Rabita.

On 10 June 1946 thousands of members of the Islamic league and other Eritreans gathered to listen to Abdulkadir's political speech. As in previous times, in that speech, Abdulkadir emphasized the importance of education, “...I repeated the words ‘Freedom’ and ‘Independence’ excessively, but I didn't mention the means. That is because the means [to freedom and independence] is obvious and they have only one door: it is education. If we are truly demanding freedom and Independence, we have only one means to achieve that: education alone, education alone....”, he said. After that long speech in which Abdulkadir outlined his party's goals and demands, Abdulkadir become the most admired and the most Charismatic leader of the age. His oratory skills and sound vision were confirmed.

Fluent in Arabic, Tigrigna, Tigre, Afar and Italian, Abdulkadir was a trusted politician and an admired orator. He was known for his bravery and respectful character. His speeches were bold, yet diplomatic. His personality was expressed candidly is a song of the time: “Abdulkadir's mouth that drips words of honey” became a household jingle.

In a letter he wrote to an Eritrean friend residing in Somalia, Abdulkadir once disclosed the terrible situation of Ethiopian Muslims and assured Al Rabita's rejection to any federal union with Ethiopia. He also confirmed to his friend that Al Rabita was a nationalist party free of sectarian inclinations. Referring to the life-threatening dangers that he and his colleagues were facing, he commented,

‘If, unfortunately, we are not victorious, at least our aim will be broadly known by the Almighty and his creatures and history will attest to it. Living one year with dignity is better than living one thousand years with humiliation.’

He mentioned to his friend the Italian proverb which he is said to have frequently used, ‘Meglio vivere un giorno Leone Che Cento anni come Pecora – better to live one day as a lion than one hundred years as a lamb.’

United Nations
When the UN sent its inquiry commission to Eritrea, Abdulkadir and five other prominent members from Al Rabita appeared before the commission and affirmed the party's solid stance for independence. In March 1949 the UN sent an invitation to the leaders of the major political parties to give their views on the future of Eritrea at the Lake Success sessions. Each party chose its delegates and Abdulkadir was appointed to be among Al Rabita's delegation.

Unfortunately, fearful of his courageous speeches and the difference he would make at the conference, the pro-unionists shot Abdulkadir on Sunday 27 March 1949. After three days, on Tuesday 29, he was pronounced dead to become the first prominent Eritrean martyr in the cause for Eritrea's independence. His killer, a known thug in the streets of Asmara, was shipped to Harar in Ethiopia where he lived in fear until his death.

Abdulkadir out of the game, Aklilu HabteWeld team had to debate Ibrahim Sultan weakened and saddened team. Omar Qadi, another Eritrean independentist hero, a lawyer himself, commented on the absence of Abdulkadir by saying that the “Independentist Movement of Eritrea lost its brightest lawyer”. Ibrahim Sultan used to say, “I lost my right hand” in reference to the death of the great Abdulkadir.

Death
Abdulkadir's death touched and inspired many Eritreans, particularly his followers. Eritreans from all corners of the country had visited him at Regina-Elena Hospital in Asmara, and on a sad Wednesday of 1949, Abdulkadir who was 47 years old was put to his final resting-place in Asmara. Thousands of Eritreans and foreign dignitaries walked behind Abdulkadir's funeral procession that many claim was biggest in those days.

On his second memorial celebration, Sheikh Ahmed Saleh Basaac gave the following eulogy,

References

Eritrean male writers
1902 births
1949 deaths
Eritrean politicians
People from Northern Red Sea Region